DHR 778 (originally number 19) is a narrow-gauge steam locomotive, that was built in 1889 for the Darjeeling Himalayan Railway. It is preserved in the United Kingdom, and is the only member DHR locomotive outside of India.

History 
DHR 778 is a  B Class, a design built between 1889 and 1927. A total of 34 were built. By 2005 only 12 remained on the railway and in use (or under repair). The B class locomotives were designed by Sharp Stewart & Co. of Glasgow and built by them, their successors North British Locomotive Company (NBL, Glasgow), and three each by Baldwin Locomotive Works (BLW, Philadelphia, USA), and the DHR works at Tindharia.

Number 778 (originally No.19) was built in 1889 by Sharp Stewart & Co at the Atlas Works in Glasgow. It is the only DHR locomotive that has been taken out of India. After many years out of use at the Hesston Steam Museum, it was sold to enthusiast Adrian Shooter in the United Kingdom and restored to working order. As of 2009, it is based on Beeches Light Railway, a private railway in Oxfordshire, and has also run on the Ffestiniog Railway, the Leighton Buzzard Light Railway, the Launceston Steam Railway and the South Tynedale Railway. 778 is the only B class with a tender.

Special events
In mid-2011, for the 40th anniversary of preservation of the Froissy Dompierre Light Railway in France, three British-based locomotives visited, including locomotive 778.

In 2013, locomotive 778 ran as a part of Indian Extravaganza Fest in Bedfordshire in East England,  and in 2014 it was the main attraction at the South Tynedale Railway's Indian Summer Event

References

Preserved narrow gauge steam locomotives of Great Britain
Preserved steam locomotives of India
Sharp Stewart locomotives
0-4-0ST locomotives
Individual locomotives of India
2 ft gauge locomotives
Individual locomotives of Great Britain